Acrepidopterum reseri is a species of beetle in the family Cerambycidae. It was described by Vitali in 2002.

References

Apomecynini
Beetles described in 2002